Let's Rock and Roll the Place is a compilation album by Eddie Money.

References

Eddie Money compilation albums
2003 compilation albums